Dead by Dawn may refer to:

Film
Dead by Dawn (film festival), an annual horror film festival
Evil Dead II, a 1987 horror film sometimes promoted with the subtitle Dead by Dawn
Dead by Dawn (2020 film), a horror-thriller film

Music
"Dead by Dawn", a song from the 1990 album Deicide by Deicide
"Dead by Dawn", a song from the 2004 album No Sir, Nihilism Is Not Practical by Showbread